The Pan American Stakes is a Grade II American Thoroughbred horse race for horses that are four years or older held over a distance of one and one-half miles (twelve furlongs) on the turf usually scheduled annually in late March as an under card event on Florida Derby day at Gulfstream Park, Hallandale Beach, Florida. The event currently carries a purse of $200,000.

History

The inaugural running of the event was on Pan American Day, 14 April 1962, as the Pan American Handicap over one and one-eighth miles distance on the dirt and was easily won by Brae Burn Farm's talented six year old mare Shirley Jones who was ridden by Larry Gilligan defeating nine other starters in a time of 1:51 by five lengths.  

The event was inspired to be an attraction for horses from both North and South America and this seemed to be a success as in the first eleven runnings of the event four winners were bred in Argentina and one in Chile. Until 1971 the event was held on the last day of the Gulfstream Park Meeting which would be in mid-April and thus the event would be scheduled close to the Pan American Day festivities. 

In 1965 the event's distance was modified to its present one and a half mile on the turf with the purse doubled to $50,000 added.  

In 1973 the first year the classification system was enacted, the event was set with Grade II status with the Canadian bred Lord Vancouver victorious by 2 lengths.  

In the 1970s the event started to attract European bred long distance runners. In 1977 the French bred Gravelines set a new track record for the distance at Gulfstream Park. In 1979 the British bred Noble Dancer continued his outstanding long distance form carrying 129 pounds as the topweight after winning the G1 United Nations Handicap the previous year. The Irish bred filly Little Bonny managed an upset victory as a 20-1 longshot in 1981 although having fine form from Europe finishing second in the G1 Irish Oaks and second in the G1 Prix Vermeille (French Oaks). 

In 1983 the event was upgraded to Grade I and that year the event was run split divisions, the only time that the race was split. 

In 1990 the event was downgraded to a Grade II race and once more to Grade III in 2006. 

In 2009 the event's conditions were changed from handicap to stakes allowance with name of race changed to the Pan American Stakes.

The event was reclassified as Grade II in 2012 and with the exception of the 2015 when it was downgraded to Grade III continues this status today.

Due to inclement wet weather the event has been moved off the turf track three times. The 1975 running was shifted to the dirt track and was run at a mile and a half distance on the main track. In 1989 and 2009 the event was run at the shorter  miles distance when it was moved off the turf.

In 2013, Twilight Eclipse set a world record for  miles by winning the Pan American in a final time of 2:22.63. This time lowered the world record mark set just one week earlier at Santa Anita Park by Bright Thought in the San Luis Rey Handicap.

Records
Time record:  
 miles – 2:22.63 – Twilight Eclipse  (2013)  

Margins:
11 lengths – Mi Selecto  (1989)

Most wins:
2 – Fraise (1993, 1994)
2 – Buck's Boy (1998, 2000)
2 –  Quest Star  (2003, 2004)
2 – Newsdad (2012, 2014)

Most wins by a jockey:
 3 – Jorge Velasquez (1978, 1982, 1992)
 3 – Earlie Fires (1967, 1987, 1998)
 3 – Mike E. Smith (1994, 1996, 1999)
 3 – Edgar S. Prado (2000, 2003, 2006)
 3 – Julien R. Leparoux (2012, 2017, 2021)

Most wins by a trainer:
 6 – William I. Mott (1991, 1993, 1994, 2006, 2012, 2014)

Most wins by an owner:
2 - Bertram R. Firestone (1974, 1991)
2 - Madeleine A. Paulson (1993, 1994)
2 – Quarter B Farm (1998, 2000)
2 - Mansell Stables (2003, 2004)
2 - James S. Karp (2012, 2014)

Winners

Legend:

 
 

Notes:

§ Ran as an entry

ƒ Filly or Mare

† In the 1964 running of the event Doctor Hank K. was first past the post but was disqualified to seventh after stewards ruled that he caused interference in the running. Babington (ARG) was declared the winner.

‡ Estrano II (ARG) was a field entry with Templatio II (CHI) and Mohamed (CHI)

See also
List of American and Canadian Graded races

External links
 2020–21 Gulfstream Park Media Guide

References

Graded stakes races in the United States
Grade 2 stakes races in the United States
Horse races in Florida
Turf races in the United States
Gulfstream Park
Recurring sporting events established in 1962
1962 establishments in Florida